Bweengwa is a constituency of the National Assembly of Zambia. It covers Bweengwa in the Monze District of Southern Province, and was originally known as Monze West.

List of MPs

References

Constituencies of the National Assembly of Zambia
Constituencies established in 1968
1968 establishments in Zambia